The 2009–10 Washington Huskies men's basketball team represented the University of Washington in the 2009–10 college basketball season.  This was head coach Lorenzo Romar's 8th season at Washington. The Huskies played their home games at Bank of America Arena and are members of the Pacific-10 Conference. They finished the season 26–10, 11–7 in Pac-10 play and defeated California in the finals of the Pac-10 Tournament to claim the conference tournament championship and an automatic bid to the 2010 NCAA Division I men's basketball tournament. They earned an 11 seed in the East Region where they upset 6 seed Marquette in the first round and 3 seed and AP #8 New Mexico in the second round to advance to the Sweet Sixteen where they were defeated by 2 seed and AP #6 West Virginia to end their season.

Pre-season
In the Pac-10 preseason poll, released October 29 in Los Angeles, CA during the Pac-10 media days Washington was selected to finish 2nd in the conference.

2009–10 Team

Roster
A number of players on this team would one day play in the NBA. The list includes:
Isaiah Thomas
Quincy Pondexter
Justin Holiday
CJ Wilcox

Coaching staff

2009-10 Schedule and results
Source
All times are Pacific

|-
!colspan=9| Exhibition

|-
!colspan=9| Regular Season

|-
!colspan=9| Pac-10 tournament

|-
!colspan=10| NCAA tournament

References

Washington
Washington
Washington Huskies men's basketball seasons
Washington Huskies men's b
Washington Huskies men's b
Pac-12 Conference men's basketball tournament championship seasons